Ehmetjan Qasim (April 15, 1914 – August 27, 1949) was the president of the Second East Turkestan Republic. He was a Uyghur political leader in East Turkistan, and also the vice chairman of the Xinjiang Provincial Coalition Government. Ehmetjan was born in Ghulja in 1914. He studied at the Communist University of the Toilers of the East, Moscow in 1936 and was a member of Communist Party of Soviet Union. Ehmetjan was described as "Stalin's man" and as a "communist-minded progressive". Qasim russified his surname to "Kasimov" and became a member of the Communist Party of the Soviet Union.

Life and political career
Ehmetjan was born in Ghulja (Yining in Chinese) in 1914. He studied at the Communist University of the Toilers of the East, Moscow in 1936 and was a member of Communist Party of Soviet Union. Ehmetjan was described as "Stalin's man" and as a "communist-minded progressive". Qasim Russified his surname to "Kasimov" and became a member of the Communist Party of the Soviet Union.

He was a member of the governing council of the Second East Turkestan Republic, a Soviet-backed administration founded in three northwestern districts of Xinjiang during the Ili Rebellion in November 1944.  Qasimi himself was not involved with the planning of the rebellion.  The Second ETR was initially led by Elihan Tore, who favored forming a conservative Islamic government.  Tore was placed under house arrest in the Soviet Union in 1946, under the orders of Stalin.  Qasimi was a leader of the pro-Soviet East Turkistan Turkic People's National Liberation Committee (ETTPNLC).

In June 1946, Qasimi tried to reach a political agreement with the Nationalist Chinese leader Zhang Zhizhong to form a coalition provincial government in Dihua (present day Urumqi).  The Second ETR was to be disbanded in name but the three districts retained autonomy.  As a leader of the three districts, Qasimi called for unity and support for his government and rejected the coalition provincial government.  He explained that the people of East Turkistan had risen in rebellion only to secure their rights under the Chinese constitution.  He led a delegation to the Chinese National Assembly Nanjing to negotiate bi-lateral relations between ETR and the Republic of China.

In the summer of 1949, as Chinese Nationalists were losing the civil war to the Chinese Communists, the Soviet Union planned for ETR leaders to switch sides.  On August 22, 1949, Vasiliy Borisov, the Soviet Vice-Consul at Yining, accompanied ETR leadership in auto trip to USSR for urgent talks with Soviet officials about future of ETR, where they were told to cooperate with Communist Party of China.  They were invited by Chinese Communist leader, Mao Zedong to attend the First Chinese People's Political Consultative Conference in Beijing to prepare for the founding of the People's Republic of China.  On August 24, 1949,  Ehmetjan, Abdulkerim Abbas, Ishaq Beg Munonov, Dalelkhan Sugirbayev, Luo Zhi and other top ETR representatives (11 men in all) boarded a plane in Almaty, the capital of the Kazakh SSR, for Beijing.   On September 3, the Soviet Union informed Saifuddin Azizi, another leader of the ETR, who was not on the flight that the plane had crashed near Lake Baikal en route to Beijing, killing all on board. 

Saifuddin later secured the role of regional Chairman of Xinjiang, a job he kept from 1955 to 1978, with a brief respite during the Cultural Revolution. News of plane crash and death of Ehmetjan was not publicly announced in Xinjiang until early December, after the People's Liberation Army had secured the region. The ETR was officially dissolved on December 20, 1949.

Family
Ehmetjan Qasimi was married in January 1945 to Mahinur Qasim (Maynor Kasim; ماھىنۇر قاسىم), a native of Korgas County in Ili.  The couple had a son and a daughter.  In 1952, Mahinur Qasim became the mayor of Yining and joined the Chinese Communist Party.   She later served as a member of Standing Committee of the National People's Congress and a vice chair of the All-China Women's Federation. She has been a prominent advocate of women and children's rights.  Her memoir of her husband, Remembering Ehmetijan, was published in China in 2011.

Legacy
In the People's Republic of China, Ehmetjan Qasimi is remembered as a fighter in the struggle against the Nationalist regime. Among the Uyghurs and other Turkic inhabitants of East Turkistan he is remembered as a national hero, and fighter who gave his life defending the independence of East Turkistan. His remains were returned to China in April 1950 and later reburied in a memorial cemetery in Yining.  The cemetery has a stele with calligraphy by Mao Zedong, praising Qasimi and the others who died with him for their contributions to the Chinese civil war and mourning their death en route to the Inaugural Chinese People's Political Consultative Conference in Beijing.

See also
First East Turkestan Republic
Second East Turkestan Republic
Ili Rebellion
Incorporation of Xinjiang into the People's Republic of China

Notes

References

Bibliography
 Abdurakhman Abay, Ahmetjan Qasimi Haqqida Hikayilar, Urumqi: Xinjiang Peoples Publishing (1984)

 Zordun Sabir, Anayurt, Almaty: Nash Mir (2006)

External links
 The Soviets in Xinjiang (1911-1949) by Mark Dickens

Qasimi, Ehmetjan
People from Ili
1949 deaths
1914 births
Chinese expatriates in the Soviet Union
Communist University of the Toilers of the East alumni
Victims of aviation accidents or incidents in the Soviet Union